Girolamo Priuli may refer to:

Girolamo Priuli (1486–1567), Doge of Venice
Girolamo Priuli (1476–1547), Venetian diarist